Vicksburg is a historic city in Warren County, Mississippi, United States. It is the county seat, and the population at the 2010 census was 23,856.

Located on a high bluff on the east bank of the Mississippi River across from Louisiana, Vicksburg was built by French colonists in 1719, and the outpost withstood an attack from the native Natchez people. It was incorporated as Vicksburg in 1825 after Methodist missionary Newitt Vick.

During the American Civil War, it was a key Confederate river-port, and its July 1863 surrender to Ulysses S. Grant, along with the concurrent Battle of Gettysburg, marked the turning-point of the war. The city is home to three large installations of the United States Army Corps of Engineers, which has often been involved in local flood control.

Status
Vicksburg is the only city in, and the county seat of, Warren County, Mississippi, United States. It is located on the east bank of the Mississippi River across from Louisiana.

The city has increased in population since 1900, when 14,834 people lived here. The population was 26,407 at the 2000 census. In 2010, it was designated as the principal city of a Micropolitan Statistical Area with a total population of 49,644, which includes all of Warren County.

History

First People

The area that is now Vicksburg was long occupied by the Natchez Native Americans as part of their historical territory along the Mississippi. The Natchez spoke a language isolate not related to the Muskogean languages of the other major tribes in the area. Before the Natchez, other indigenous cultures had occupied this strategic area for thousands of years.

European settlement
The first Europeans who settled the area were French colonists who built Fort Saint Pierre in 1719 on the high bluffs overlooking the Yazoo River at present-day Redwood. They conducted fur trading with the Natchez and others, and started plantations. On 29 November 1729, the Natchez attacked the fort and plantations in and around the present-day city of Natchez. They killed several hundred settlers, including Jesuit missionary Paul Du Poisson. As was the custom, they took a number of women and children as captives, adopting them into their families.

The Natchez War was a disaster for French Louisiana, and the colonial population of the Natchez District never recovered. Aided by the Choctaw, traditional enemies of the Natchez, though, the French defeated and scattered the Natchez and their allies, the Yazoo.

The Choctaw Nation took over the area by right of conquest and inhabited it for several decades. The treaty was the first of a series that eventually led to the removal of most of the Choctaw to Indian Territory west of the Mississippi River in 1830. Some Choctaw remained in Mississippi, citing article XIV of the Treaty of Dancing Rabbit Creek; they became citizens of the state and the United States. They struggled to maintain their culture against the pressure of the binary slave society, which classified people as only white or black.

In 1790, the Spanish founded a military outpost on the site, which they called Fort Nogales (nogales meaning "walnut trees"). When the Americans took possession in 1798 following the American Revolutionary War and a treaty with Spain, they changed the name to Walnut Hills. The small village was incorporated in 1825 as Vicksburg, named after Newitt Vick, a Methodist minister who had established a Protestant mission on the site.

In 1835, during the Murrell Excitement, a mob from Vicksburg attempted to expel the gamblers from the city, because the citizens were tired of the rougher element treating the city residents with nothing but contempt. They captured and hanged five gamblers who had shot and killed a local doctor. Historian Joshua D. Rothman calls this event "the deadliest outbreak of extralegal violence in the slave states between the Southampton Insurrection and the Civil War."

Civil War
During the American Civil War, the city finally surrendered during the Siege of Vicksburg, after which the Union Army gained control of the entire Mississippi River. The 47-day siege was intended to starve the city into submission. Its location atop a high bluff overlooking the Mississippi River proved otherwise impregnable to assault by federal troops. The surrender of Vicksburg by Confederate General John C. Pemberton on July 4, 1863, together with the defeat of General Robert E. Lee at Gettysburg the day before, has historically marked the turning point of the Civil War in the Union's favor.

From the surrender of Vicksburg until the end of the war in 1865, the area was under Union military occupation.

The Confederate president, Jefferson Davis, was based at his family plantation at Brierfield, just south of the city.

Losing of Mississippi access and commercial status

Because of Vicksburg's location on the Mississippi River, it built extensive trade from the prodigious steamboat traffic in the 19th century. It shipped out cotton coming to it from surrounding counties and was a major trading city in West Central Mississippi.

However, in 1876, a Mississippi River flood cut off the large meander next to Vicksburg through the De Soto Point, which changed the Mississippi River's course away from the city. Vicksburg only retained access to an oxbow lake formed from the old channel of the river, which effectively isolated the city from accessing the Mississippi riverfront. The city's economy suffered greatly due to the lack of a functional river port; Vicksburg would not be a river town again until the completion of the Yazoo Diversion Canal in 1903 by the U.S. Army Corps of Engineers.

Between 1881 and 1894, the Anchor Line, a prominent steamboat company on the Mississippi River from 1859 to 1898, operated a steamboat called the City of Vicksburg.

Political and racial unrest after Civil War
Celebrations of the 4th of July, the day of surrender, were irregular until 1947. The Vicksburg Evening Post of July 4, 1883, called July 4 "the day we don't celebrate", and another Vicksburg newspaper, the Daily Commercial Appeal, in 1888 hoped that a political victory would bring an enthusiastic celebration the following year. In 1902, the 4th of July saw only "a parade of colored draymen". In 1947, the Jackson Clarion-Ledger stated that the city of Vicksburg did not celebrate the 4th of July again until 1945, and then it was celebrated as Confederate Carnival Day. A recent scholar disagrees, stating that large Fourth of July celebrations were being held by 1907, and informal celebrations before that. A large parade was held in 1890.

In the first few years after the Civil War, white Confederate veterans developed the Ku Klux Klan, beginning in Tennessee; it had chapters throughout the South and attacked freedmen and their supporters. It was suppressed about 1870. By the mid-1870s, new white paramilitary groups had arisen in the Deep South, including the Red Shirts in Mississippi, as whites struggled to regain political and social power over the black majority. Elections were marked by violence and fraud as white Democrats worked to suppress black Republican voting.

In August 1874, a black sheriff, Peter Crosby, was elected in Vicksburg. Letters by a white planter, Batchelor, detail the preparations of whites for what he described as a "race war," including acquisition of the newest Winchester guns. On December 7, 1874, white men disrupted a black Republican meeting celebrating Crosby's victory and held him in custody before running him out of town. He advised blacks from rural areas to return home; along the way, some were attacked by armed whites. During the next several days, armed white mobs swept through black areas, killing other men at home or out in the fields. Sources differ as to total fatalities, with 29–50 blacks and 2 whites reported dead at the time. Twenty-first-century historian Emilye Crosby estimates that 300 blacks were killed in the city and the surrounding area of Claiborne County, Mississippi. The Red Shirts were active in Vicksburg and other Mississippi areas, and black pleas to the federal government for protection were not met.

At the request of Republican Governor Adelbert Ames, who had left the state during the violence, President Ulysses S. Grant sent federal troops to Vicksburg in January 1875. In addition, a congressional committee investigated what was called the "Vicksburg Riot" at the time (and reported as the "Vicksburg Massacre" by northern newspapers.) They took testimony from both black and white residents, as reported by the New York Times, but no one was ever prosecuted for the deaths. The Red Shirts and other white insurgents suppressed Republican voting by both whites and blacks; smaller-scale riots were staged in the state up to the 1875 elections, at which time white Democrats regained control of a majority of seats in the state legislature.

Under new constitutions, amendments and laws passed between 1890 in Mississippi and 1908 in the remaining southern states, white Democrats disenfranchised most blacks and many poor whites by creating barriers to voter registration, such as poll taxes, literacy tests, and grandfather clauses. They passed laws imposing Jim Crow and racial segregation of public facilities.

On March 12, 1894, the popular soft drink Coca-Cola was bottled for the first time in Vicksburg by Joseph A. Biedenharn, a local confectioner. Today, surviving 19th-century Biedenharn soda bottles are prized by collectors of Coca-Cola memorabilia. The original candy store has been renovated and is used as the Biedenharn Coca-Cola Museum.

20th century to present
The exclusion of most blacks from the political system lasted for decades until after Congressional passage of civil rights legislation in the mid-1960s. Lynchings of blacks and other forms of white racial terrorism against them continued to occur in Vicksburg after the start of the 20th century. In May 1903, for instance, two black men charged with murdering a planter were taken from jail by a mob of 200 farmers and lynched before they could go to trial. In May 1919, as many as a thousand white men broke down three sets of steel doors to abduct, hang, burn and shoot a black prisoner, Lloyd Clay, who was falsely accused of raping a white woman. From 1877 to 1950 in Warren County, 14 African Americans were lynched by whites, most in the decades near the turn of the century.

The United States Army Corps of Engineers diverted the Yazoo River in 1903 into the old, shallowing channel to revive the waterfront of Vicksburg. The port city was able to receive steamboats again, but much freight and passenger traffic had moved to railroads, which had become more competitive.

Railroad access to the west across the river continued to be by transfer steamers and ferry barges until a combination railroad-highway bridge was built in 1929. After 1973, Interstate 20 bridged the river. Freight rail traffic still crosses by the old bridge. North-south transportation links are by the Mississippi River and U.S. Highway 61. Vicksburg has the only crossing over the Mississippi River between Greenville and Natchez, and the only interstate highway crossing of the river between Baton Rouge and Memphis.

During the Great Mississippi Flood of 1927, in which hundreds of thousands of acres were inundated, Vicksburg served as the primary gathering point for refugees. Relief parties put up temporary housing, as the flood submerged a large percentage of the Mississippi Delta.

Because of the overwhelming damage from the flood, the US Army Corps of Engineers established the Waterways Experiment Station as the primary hydraulics laboratory, to develop protection of important croplands and cities. Now known as the Engineer Research and Development Center, it applies military engineering, information technology, environmental engineering, hydraulic engineering, and geotechnical engineering to problems of flood control and river navigation.

In December 1953, a severe tornado swept across Vicksburg, causing 38 deaths and destroying nearly 1,000 buildings.

During World War II, cadets from the Royal Air Force, flying from their training base at Terrell, Texas, routinely flew to Vicksburg on training flights. The town served as a stand-in for the British for Cologne, Germany, which is the same distance from London, England as Vicksburg is from Terrell.

Particularly after World War II, in which many blacks served, returning veterans began to be active in the civil rights movement, wanting to have full citizenship after fighting in the war. In Mississippi, activists in the Vicksburg Movement became prominent during the 1960s.

Contemporary Vicksburg
In 2001, a group of Vicksburg residents visited the Paducah, Kentucky, mural project, looking for ideas for their own community development. In 2002, the Vicksburg Riverfront murals program was begun by Louisiana mural artist Robert Dafford and his team on the floodwall located on the waterfront in downtown. Subjects for the murals were drawn from the history of Vicksburg and the surrounding area. They include President Theodore Roosevelt's bear hunt, the Sultana, the Sprague, the Siege of Vicksburg, the Kings Crossing site, Willie Dixon, the Flood of 1927, the 1953 Vicksburg, Mississippi tornado, Rosa A. Temple High School (known for integration activism) and the Vicksburg National Military Park. The project was finished in 2009 with the completion of the Jitney Jungle/Glass Kitchen mural.

In the fall of 2010, a new 55-foot mural was painted on a section of wall on Grove Hill across the street from the original project by former Dafford muralists Benny Graeff and Herb Roe. The mural's subject is the annual "Run thru History" held in the Vicksburg National Military Park.

On December 6–7, 2014, a symposium was held on the 140th anniversary of the 1874 riots. A variety of scholars gave papers and an open panel discussion was held on the second day at the Vicksburg National Military Park, in collaboration with the Jacqueline House African American Museum.

Geography

Vicksburg is located at the confluence of the Mississippi and Yazoo Rivers. Much of the city is on top of a high bluff on the east bank of the Mississippi River. Vicksburg is also served by Interstate 20. The interstate opens Vicksburg with a Cloverleaf interchange that heads out to U.S. Route 61 North towards Rolling Fork, Mississippi, Clarksdale, Mississippi, and stretches out for another 77 miles towards Memphis, Tennessee. On the south part of the exit, it heads on Mississippi Highway 27 towards Utica, Mississippi. As the interstate goes on it makes interchanges with Clay Street, Indiana Avenue, and Halls Ferry Road. After the downtown interchanges are over, before finally crossing in Louisiana with a Cloverleaf interchange, I-20 makes a Directional T interchange with US-61, and US-61 heads south toward Port Gibson, Mississippi, Natchez, Mississippi, and then continues for another 92 miles into Baton Rouge, Louisiana, Louisiana's capital city. Interstate 20 then continues to head west towards Monroe, Louisiana, Shreveport, Louisiana, Dallas, and lastly after 445 miles, making a Trumpet interchange with Interstate 10 in Toyah, Texas.

Climate
Vicksburg has a humid subtropical climate with mild winters and hot, humid summers.

Demographics

2020 census

As of the 2020 United States Census, there were 21,573 people, 8,969 households, and 4,864 families residing in the city.

2000 census
As of the census of 2000, 26,407 people, 10,364 households, and 6,612 families resided in the city, with a metropolitan population of 49,644. The population density was 803.1 people per square mile (310.1/km). The 11,654 housing units averaged 354.4 per square mile (136.9/km). The racial makeup of the city was 60.43% African American, 37.80% White, 0.15% Native American, 0.61% Asian, 0.43% from other races, and 0.59% from two or more races. Hispanics or Latinos of any race were 1.04% of the population.

Of the 10,364 households, 32.2% had children under the age of 18 living with them, 34.9% were married couples living together, 24.2% had a female householder with no husband present, and 36.2% were not families. About 32.0% of all households were made up of individuals, and 13.6% had someone living alone who was 65 years of age or older. The average household size was 2.49 and the average family size was 3.15.

In the city, the population was distributed as 28.4% under the age of 18, 9.3% from 18 to 24, 27.9% from 25 to 44, 19.6% from 45 to 64, and 14.8% who were 65 years of age or older. The median age was 34 years. For every 100 females, there were 82.9 males. For every 100 females age 18 and over, there were 77.3 males.

The median income for a household in the city was $28,466, and for a family was $34,380. Males had a median income of $29,420 versus $20,728 for females. The per capita income for the city was $16,174. About 19.3% of families and 23.0% of the population were below the poverty line, including 34.8% of those under age 18 and 16.5% of those age 65 or over.

Economy

In 2017, Emma Green of The Atlantic stated, "The Army Corps of Engineers sustains the town economically".

Casinos
Vicksburg is the home of four casinos along the Mississippi River.

 Ameristar Casino Vicksburg
 Casino Vicksburg (formerly Lady Luck Casino Vicksburg)
 Riverwalk Casino Hotel 
 Water View Casino

Transportation
The Yazoo and Mississippi Valley Railroad and then the Illinois Central Railroad for several decades had passenger service through the city, at two different stations, one on Levee Street, and the other on Cherry Street. The IC's Planter went north to Memphis, Tennessee and south to New Orleans. The Chery Street station hosted the Northeastern Limited and an unnamed train east to Jackson and Meridian (sleeping car passengers could continue to New York; coach passengers could transfer at Meridian's Union Station to an Atlanta and New York bound train there), and the Southwestern Limited and another train west to Monroe and Shreveport's Union Station. The final train serving Vicksburg was the Southwestern Limited/Northeastern Limited in 1967.

Interstate 20 runs east-west through the southern part of Vicksburg. U.S. Highway 80 runs east-west through the city. U.S. Highway 61 runs north-south through the city.

The nearest airport with commercial flights is Jackson–Medgar Wiley Evers International Airport, 53.2 miles to the east of Vicksburg. Vicksburgh Tallulah Regional Airport and Vicksburg Municipal Airport, to the west and to the south of Vicksburg, are two general aviation airports.

Arts and culture

Annual cultural events
Every summer, Vicksburg plays host to the Miss Mississippi Pageant and Parade. Also every summer, the Vicksburg Homecoming Benevolent Club hosts a homecoming weekend/reunion that provides scholarships to graduating high-school seniors. Former residents from across the country return for the event.

Every spring and summer, Vicksburg Theatre Guild hosts Gold in the Hills, which holds the Guinness World Record for longest-running show.

Places of interest
 City Hall, a 1902 Beaux-Arts Classical Revival design by the architect James Riely Gordon.
 Anchuca Mansion
 Balfour House
 McRaven House
 Old Court House Museum
 Vicksburg National Military Park
 Pemberton's Headquarters
 U.S.S. Cairo Gunboat & Museum
 Vicksburg Riverfront Murals
 Vicksburg Theatre Guild

Government

The city government consists of a mayor who is elected at-large and two aldermembers. The current mayor is George Flaggs Jr., who defeated former mayor Paul Winfield in the June 2013 election. The two aldermembers are elected from single-member districts, known as wards.

The city is home to three large US Army Corps of Engineers installations: the Engineer Research and Development Center (ERDC), which also houses the ERDC's Waterways Experiment Station; the Mississippi Valley Division headquarters; and the Vicksburg District headquarters.

The 412th Engineer Command of the US Army Reserve and the 168th Engineer Brigade of the Mississippi Army National Guard are also located in Vicksburg.

The United States Coast Guard's 8th District/Lower Mississippi River sector has an Aids To Navigation unit located in Vicksburg, operating the buoy tending vessel USCGC Kickapoo.

Education

The City of Vicksburg is served by the Vicksburg-Warren School District.

High schools
 Vicksburg High School
 1988–1989 National Blue Ribbon School
 Warren Central High School

Junior high schools
 Vicksburg Junior High School
 Warren Central Junior High School
 Academy of Innovation

Elementary schools
 Beechwood Elementary School
 Bovina Elementary School
 Bowmar Avenue Magnet School
 Dana Road Elementary School
 Redwood Elementary School
 Sherman Avenue Elementary School
 South Park Elementary School
 Warrenton Elementary School
 Vicksburg Intermediate School
 Warren Central Intermediate School

Private schools
 Porters Chapel Academy
 Vicksburg Catholic School - St. Francis Xavier Elementary and Saint Aloysius Catholic High School (of the Roman Catholic Diocese of Jackson)
 Vicksburg Christian Academy
 Vicksburg Buddhist Fellowship 
 Vicksburg Community School (K-12)

Former schools
 Hall's Ferry Road Elementary School
 1985–1986, National Blue Ribbon School
 Culkin Elementary School
 Jett Elementary School
 Cedars Elementary School
 Vicksburg Middle School
 All Saints' Episcopal School was a local boarding school located on Confederate Avenue, which closed in 2006 after 98 years in operation. The historic school is now a regional campus for AmeriCorps NCCC. 
 St. Mary's Catholic School served the African-American community.
 McIntyre Elementary School served the African-American community.
 Magnolia Avenue School serviced the African-American community and was renamed Bowman High School to honor a former principal.
 Rosa A. Temple High School served the African-American community.
 King's Elementary School served the African-American community.
 Carr Central High School.
 J.H. Culkin Academy (grades 1-12 until 1965, thereafter Culkin Elementary School).
 H.V. Cooper High School. First graduating class 1959.
 Jefferson Davis School.
 Oak Ridge School.
 Eliza Fox School (a.k.a. Grove Street School).
 All Saints' College. An Episcopal college for white women. Opened in 1908 and closed in 1962.

Media

Newspapers 

Vicksburg Daily News, Vicksburg's only locally owned news source.

The Vicksburg Post, formerly the Vicksburg Evening Post'.

 Radio 

AM Station

FM Stations

Notable people

 William Wirt Adams, Confederate Army officer and member of the Mississippi House of Representatives
 Katherine Bailess, actress, singer and dancer
Earle Basinsky, crime novelist
 Edwin C. Bearss, historian
 Joseph A. Biedenharn (1866–1952), entrepreneur: first bottled Coca-Cola in 1894 at a location in Vicksburg
 Johnny Brewer, football player
 Margaret Hunt Brisbane (1858–1925), poet
 Roosevelt Brown, former Major League Baseball outfielder for the Chicago Cubs
 William Denis Brown, III, lawyer, businessman, state senator from Monroe, Louisiana; born in Vicksburg in 1931 
 Ellis Burks, former MLB outfielder
 Charles Burnett, filmmaker
 Malcolm Butler, cornerback for the New England Patriots and Tennessee Titans
 Odia Coates, pop singer
 Rod Coleman, defensive tackle for the Atlanta Falcons
 Caroline Russell Compton, Mississippi artist
 Mart Crowley, playwright, TV executive
 Jefferson Davis, President of the Confederate States of America (previously U.S. Congressman, Senator, Secretary of War)
 Bobby DeLaughter, Mississippi state judge and prosecutor
 Willie Dixon, blues bassist, singer, songwriter, and producer
 John "Kayo" Dottley, college All-American and professional football player
 Myrlie Evers-Williams, civil rights activist and journalist
 Mark Gray, country music singer, born in Vicksburg in 1952
 Louis Green, linebacker for the Denver Broncos
 DeMichael Harris, wide receiver for the Indianapolis Colts
 Milt Hinton, jazz bassist
 Jay Hopson, football head coach, University of Southern Mississippi
 Joseph Holt, longest-serving Judge Advocate General of the Army
 Delbert Hosemann, Jr., Lt Governor of Mississippi and former Secretary of State
 Hank Jones, jazz pianist, born in Vicksburg
 Martin F. Jue, amateur radio products inventor, entrepreneur
 Patrick Kelly, fashion designer
 Brad Leggett, football player, Seattle Seahawks center
 George McConnell, former guitarist for Widespread Panic, Kudzu Kings, and Beanland
 William Michael Morgan, country music singer
 Michael Myers, defensive tackle for the Cincinnati Bengals
 Key Pittman, U.S. Senator from Nevada, 1913–40; born in Vicksburg
 Vail M. Pittman, 19th Governor of Nevada
 Evelyn Preer, African-American film actress
 George Reed, former running back for the Saskatchewan Roughriders, CFL Hall of Fame member, Order of Canada member, Saskatchewan Order of Merit member
 Beah Richards, African-American film and television actress
 Kee Sloan, Episcopal priest and eleventh Bishop of Alabama
 Roy C. Strickland, businessman and politician in Louisiana and Texas, born in Vicksburg in 1942
 Taylor Tankersley, Florida Marlins relief pitcher
 John Thomas, former MLB player (Colorado Rockies, New York Mets, Texas Rangers, Atlanta Braves, Kansas City Royals)
 Mary T. Washington, the first African-American woman CPA
 Carl Westcott, entrepreneur, founder of 1-800-Flowers and Westcott Communications
 Delmon Young, outfielder for the Philadelphia Phillies
 Dmitri Young, first baseman for the Washington Nationals
 Jaelyn Young, pleaded guilty to charges relating to her attempts to join ISIS

Cultural references
 Vicksburg is mentioned in the Pulitzer Prize winning play Crimes of the Heart by Beth Henley.
 Several delta blues songs mention Vicksburg, for instance Charley Patton's "High Water Everywhere" and Robert Johnson's "Traveling Riverside Blues"
 The city is mentioned multiple times in the series of books surrounding the Logan family, including Roll of Thunder, Hear My Cry (1976) and Let The Circle Be Unbroken (1981), by Mildred Taylor.
 A made-for-TV movie version of I Know Why the Caged Bird Sings, based on Maya Angelou's memoir, was filmed in Vicksburg.
 O Brother, Where Art Thou? was filmed in Vicksburg. The Stokes campaign dinner was filmed in the Southern Cultural Heritage Center's auditorium.
 The hospital stairway scene from Mississippi Burning was filmed in the Southern Cultural Heritage Convent (with Gene Hackman and Willem Dafoe).
 Vicksburg is featured in Robert A. Heinlein's 1982 science fiction novel Friday as a town in the Lone Star Republic, a leading smugglers' port between Texas and the Chicago Imperium. The book's protagonist Friday Baldwin stayed there, particularly in the riverfront Lowtown, while trying to find a way into the Imperium.
 In the novel Underground to Canada the protagonists Julilly and Liza are slaves on a cotton plantation near Vicksburg.
 Vicksburg was the focus of four episodes of the American television series Ghost Adventures during Season 19, with one episode dedicated to Champion Hill Battlefield.
On Elton John’s 1974 album ‘‘Caribou, the song Dixy Lily contains the lyrics “Down from Louisiana on the Vicksburg run.” in the chorus.

See also

 USS Vicksburg, 5 ships

References

Further reading
 Rothman, Joshua D.: Flush Times and Fever Dreams: A Story of Capitalism and Slavery in the Age of Jackson. Athens: University of Georgia Press, 2010.
 
 Cox, James L. The Mississippi Almanac''. (2001). .
 History of Vicksburg's Jewish community

External links

 City of Vicksburg
 Vicksburg Chamber of Commerce
 

 
Cities in Mississippi
Cities in Warren County, Mississippi
Mississippi populated places on the Mississippi River
County seats in Mississippi
Populated places established in the 1790s
Micropolitan areas of Mississippi
1826 establishments in Mississippi
French-American culture in Mississippi